The 2022 World Women's Snooker Championship was a women's snooker tournament that took place at the Ding Junhui Snooker Academy in Sheffield, England from 11 to 14 February 2022. It was the first staging of the World Women's Snooker Championship since 2019, following an 18-month suspension of the World Women's Snooker Tour between March 2020 and August 2021, due to the COVID-19 pandemic. In addition to receiving the newly renamed Mandy Fisher Trophy, the winner of the tournament earned a place on the professional World Snooker Tour from the start of the 2022–23 snooker season.

Reanne Evans was the defending champion, having defeated Nutcharut Wongharuthai 6–3 in the 2019 final to win her 12th women's world title. However, Evans lost 1–4 to Wendy Jans in the quarter-finals, the first time in her career that she had not reached the semi-finals of the tournament. Three-time champion Ng On-yee came from 0–3 behind in her quarter-final against Wongharuthai to force a deciding frame, but Wongharuthai won the match 4–3 on the final black. The quarter-final losses by Evans and Ng meant that no former champion reached the semi-finals.

Wongharuthai won the tournament, defeating Wendy Jans 6–5 in the final. She became the first Thai player to win the women's world title, the 13th different winner of the tournament since its inception in 1976, the first new champion since 2015, and the only player besides Evans or Ng to win the title in 19 years. She gained a two-year professional tour card, allowing her to join the World Snooker Tour from the beginning of the following season. Upon her return to Thailand, she was granted an audience with the country's prime minister Prayut Chan o-cha, and its Minister for Tourism and Sports Pipat Ratchakitprakarn.

Prize fund 
The breakdown of prize money for the event is shown below:

 Winner: £6,000
 Runner-up: £2,500
 Semi-final: £1,250
 Quarter-final: £600
 Last 16: £300
 Preliminary Round : £150
 Highest break: £200
 Total: £17,200

Final summary 

The final, contested as the best of 11 frames between Thai player Nutcharut Wongharuthai and Belgian player Wendy Jans, lasted five hours and 40 minutes. Although Wongharuthai took an initial 2–1 lead, Jans then won four of the next five frames to lead 5–3, also contributing the final's highest break of 84 in the fourth frame. Wongharuthai later stated: "When I was 5–3 behind I thought that I had lost, and I really just started to play for fun because I was too tense. Luckily, it worked." Wongharuthai won the next two frames to level the scores at 5–5. Requiring a snooker in the decider with only the colours remaining, Jans potted the yellow and green before obtaining four foul points when Wongharuthai failed to escape from a snooker on the brown. Jans then potted the brown, blue, and pink, but missed a long black into the yellow pocket, leaving it over the middle. Wongharuthai potted the black to clinch the title.

Results

Main draw

Players listed in bold indicate match winners.

Final

Source: WPBSA Tournament Manager.

References

World Women's Snooker Championship
Women's
Snooker
World Women's Snooker Championship
World Women's Snooker Championship
International sports competitions hosted by England
Sports competitions in Sheffield